The Wesleyan Avenue Historic District is a residential historic district in the Elmwood section of Providence, Rhode Island.  It includes 25 houses, on a one-block section of Wesleyan Avenue between Taylor and Broad Streets, with a few of them on the two end streets.  They are large two-plus story wood-frame houses, set on modest lot, all of which were built between 1875 and 1900.  The houses are in a diversity of styles popular at that time, including Second Empire, Stick style, and Queen Anne.  The district includes what is one of Providence's finest Stick style houses, the Samuel Darling House at 53 Wesleyan Avenue.  It was built in 1885, and displays a wealth of applied wood work, decorative shingling, and intricately carved porch details.

The district was listed on the National Register of Historic Places in 1982.

See also
National Register of Historic Places listings in Providence, Rhode Island

References

Historic districts in Providence County, Rhode Island
Geography of Providence, Rhode Island
National Register of Historic Places in Providence, Rhode Island
Historic districts on the National Register of Historic Places in Rhode Island